"Pray for the Peace of Jerusalem" (Hebrew: "שאלו שלום ירושלם, ישליו אהביך") is a sculpture by the Israeli artist Dani Karavan located on the southern wall of the Knesset assembly hall in Jerusalem, Israel.

History
In 1964, at the age of 33, Dani Karavan was commissioned by Dora Gad, the Knesset interior architect, to create a sculpture that would form the western central wall of the Knesset assembly hall. The piece was completed in 1966.

The sculpture is carved in limestone from the Deir al-Asad quarry in the Galilee. It is 24 meters wide and 7 meters tall. The sculpture is one of two Dani Karavan art pieces located in the Knesset; the second piece is the front wooden wall of the Knesset Auditorium.

References

External links
 Artwork in the Knesset

Knesset
Israeli art